Neema Barnette is an American film director and producer, and the first African-American woman to direct a primetime sitcom. Barnette was the first African-American woman to get a three-picture deal with Sony. Since then, she accumulated a number of awards, including a Peabody, an Emmy and NAACP Image Award.

Early life 
Neema Barnette, born on December 14, 1949, is a native New Yorker. She attended the High School For The Performing Arts, and began her career as a stage actress. Barnette continued her education by attending The City College of New York earning a BA. She also received a MFA from NYU School Of The Arts.

Career 

At age 21, Barnette directed the play, "The Blue Journey" by OyamO, at Joseph Papp's Public Theater. In 1982, Barnette co-produced the Emmy award-winning After-School Special, "To Be A Man" along with Cliff Frazier, who was also the writer and director. The both won Emmys for Outstanding Children's Programming. The movie starred, Robert Earl Jones, Estelle Evans, Stuart Bascombe, Julius Hollingsworth and Curtis Worthy. James Earl Jones (Robert Earl Jones son), was executive director.

Barnette has directed stage, episodic television, made for TV movies and feature films. Sky Captain was her first short film which she directed as part of the American Film Institute's (AFI) Directing Workshop for Women in 1985.

In 1990, she founded Harlem Girl Productions Corporation. Since 1997, Barnette has also worked for the Harlem Lite Productions. She has directed multiple seasons and episodes of a variety of television sitcoms including A Different World, The Cosby Show, Gilmore Girls, and 7th Heaven.

In 1997, Barnette directed the film Spirit Lost, a psychological thriller with a love triangle that includes a ghost.

In 2002, she was selected as one of ten artists to judge the American Film Institute's "Best Films Award".

In 2003, Barnette directed her first feature film, an adaptation of Civil Brand, she told the Los Angeles Times it was inspired by the original screenplay by Preston A Whitmore II and by an urban women's prison tale. Even after her mother passed, she encouraged Barnette to continue pursuing the film. Once the movie was completed, it earned many awards and played film festivals like Sundance, the American Film Institute, and the American Black Film Festival in Miami where “Civil Brand” won the $15,000 Blockbuster audience award.

Her most recent feature film is Woman Thou Art Loosed: On the 7th Day (2012), her 11th movie and third for theatrical release. The film is a thriller and family drama following the story of a marriage on the rocks, which received an NAACP Image Award Nomination for Best Independent Feature in 2012. Barnette directed two episodes of Being Mary Jane: "Hot Seat" and "Don't Call It A Comeback" (2015 - Season 3). Barnette is the Executive Producer of Black History Mini Docs, 90 second videos featuring the stories of African-American heroes and she-roes, as well as daily tributes which are posted on Facebook, Twitter & Pinterest.

In 2009 Barnette directed a gospel musical film, "Heaven Ain't Hard to Find," starring Kim Whitley, Cliff Powell and Reed McCants, where it previewed on platforms on HBO and BET.

In 2016, she joined the series, Queen Sugas as director and producer.

Barnette won her first NAACP Image® Award for her directing efforts, like "One More Hurdle," an NBC dramatic special. Another documentary of hers titled "The Silent Crime," an NBC about domestic violence, received four local Emmy® nominations. Her successful debut resulted in subsequent directing stints on "Hooperman," "The Royal Family," "China Beach" (Peabody Award), "Frank's Place" (Emmy® Award), "The Sinbad Show," "Diagnosis Murder," "A Different World" and many episodes of "The Cosby Show."

Neema Barnette is also part of the  DGA African American Steering Committee and a member of The Black Filmmakers Foundation since its inception. She is also an active AFI alumnus and takes part on the panel of the AFI Independent Film committee. She  has also played a part in being on the executive board of the IFP Gordon Parks Scholarship fund. She has been a judge for the NAACP Feature Film Award and serves as an annual  judge for the Pan African Film Festival in Los Angeles.

Personal
Barnette owns her own production company called Harlem Girl Productions, whilst also owning a production company titled Reel Rebel Productions with her husband Reed McCants. Notably, she is also the executive director of a theatre and performance company for young artists titled Live Theatre Gang. Barnette is also a part-time teacher, where she teaches aspiring students a directing course at UCLA and USC. She spends the other part of her time running a theatre company titled Live Theatre Gang with her husband and actor, Reed R. McCants.

Filmography

Films Directed
Super Sweet 16: The Movie (2007)
All You've Got (2005)
Zora Is My Name!
Better Off Dead
Run for the Dream: The Gail Devers Story
Close to Danger
Spirit Lost
Woman Thou Art Loosed: On the 7th Day
Heaven Ain't Hard to Find
Better off Dead

Television Directed
 Naomi - Enigma
 The Equalizer Episode - Separated
 Genius: Aretha Episode 2 - Until The Real Thing Comes Along
 Genius: Aretha Episode 3 - Do Right Woman 2021
 Paradise Lost 2020
 Black Lightning 2019
 Raising Dion 2019
 Midnight, Texas 2018
 The Good Cop 2018
 Love is _  2018 
 Luke Cage 2018 
 Blind Spot 2018  
 The Breaks 2017 
 Being Mary Jane 2015-2017
 Queen Sugar 2016
 Miracle's Boys 2005
 Gilmore Girls
 The PJs  
 Diagnosis Murder  1994-1998
 7th Heaven 
 Deadly Games 1996 
 The Cosby Mysteries 1994-1995
Scattered Dreams 1993
 The Sinbad Show  1993  
 The Royal Family  1991
 Different Worlds: A Story of Interracial Love  
 The Cosby Show  1989-1991
 A Different World  1990-1991  
 Zora Is My Name! 1990
 China Beach  1990
 The Robert Guillaume Show 1989
 It's a Living 1988-1989
 Hooperman 1989
 Frank's Place  1987
 What's Happening Now  1986
 One More Hurdle (1984)

Produced 
 King of Stage: The Woodie King Jr. Story (Documentary) (executive producer)
 2016 Queen Sugar (TV Series) (producer - 13 episodes)
 2012 Woman Thou Art Loosed: On the 7th Day (producer)
 2008 Cuttin Da Mustard (executive producer) / (producer)
 2002 Civil Brand (producer) 
 1986 "To Be A Man", an ABC Television Children's Special, (producer)

Awards

She has won numerous awards, honors, and nominations, among them an Emmy Award for her afterschool special To Be a Man, two NAACP Image Awards, and a Sundance Film Festival Award.

The Silent Crime, an American Women in Radio & Television award for directing. 
Barnette won an International Monitor Award for Best Director for The Cosby Show episode, 'The Day the Spores Landed.' 
ZORA IS MY NAME (American Playhouse production starring Ruby Dee which won a Lilly Award for Exceptional Representation of African American Images in Film)
One More Hurdle,” an NBC dramatic special, won Neema her first NAACP Image® Award for her directing efforts.
While directing an episode for Cosby in which Mr. Cosby gets pregnant, “The Day The Spores Landed” (International Monitor® Award for Best Director)
The Delta Society awarded Neema their prestigious Lilly® Award for exceptional representation of African American images in film.
The Cosby Mysteries. “ For one episode she directed the show received a Peabody® and Emmy® Award.

References

External links

1959 births
African-American film directors
African-American film producers
African-American television directors
American television directors
American women film directors
Film producers from New York (state)
American women television directors
Living people
Film directors from New York City
American women film producers
21st-century African-American people
21st-century African-American women
20th-century African-American people
20th-century African-American women